Cygnet River is a locality in the Australian state of South Australia located on Kangaroo Island about  south-west of the state capital of Adelaide and about   from the municipal seat  of Kingscote.

Its boundaries were created in 2002 in respect to “the long established name” which is reported to be derived from the stream located within its boundaries.

Cygnet River is located within the federal division of Mayo, the state electoral district of Mawson and the local government area of the Kangaroo Island Council.

Land use
The major land use within the locality is primary production.  The locality also includes the Kingscote Airport and the Cygnet Estuary Conservation Park.

Cygnet River contains the following places listed on the South Australian Heritage Register - the Farm and Eucalyptus Oil Distillery Ruins, Duck Lagoon and the Dwelling & Eucalyptus Oil Distillery Ruins (Cygnet River).

River
The locality of Cygnet River is named for the watercourse also named Cygnet River. It is the longest river on Kangaroo Island. They are named after the Cygnet which was the fifth ship to arrive in South Australia in 1836. The river empties via a delta on the western shore of Western Cove, part of Nepean Bay. It had previously been named the Morgan River after Robert Clark Morgan, the captain of the Duke of York, another of the ships in the First Fleet of South Australia.

See also

Cygnet (disambiguation)

References
Notes

Citations

Towns on Kangaroo Island